TechTarget is an American company which offers data-driven marketing services to business-to-business technology vendors. It uses purchase intent data gleaned from the readership of its 140 + technology focused web sites to help tech vendors reach buyers actively researching relevant IT products and services.

TechTarget, Inc. was founded in 1999 and is headquartered in Newton, Massachusetts with offices in London, Munich, Paris, San Francisco, Singapore and Sydney.

History 
TechTarget was founded in 1999 by Greg Strakosch and Don Hawk as a spin-off of United Communications Group (UCG). In 2001, the company was recognized by B2B Magazine on the Media Power 50 list. In 2005, AdAge named CEO Greg Strakosch a Top 25 Newsmaker.

In 2016, TechTarget named Michael Cotoia as CEO and board member, and elected Greg Stakosch as executive chairman. The company had its initial public offering in May 2007, listing on the NASDAQ exchange with symbol TTGT.

Its current board of directors includes EMC Corporation founder Roger Marino, Atlanta Hawks co-owner Bruce Levenson, former CFO of the New York Times Co., CEO Michael Cotoia and executive chairman Greg Strakosch.

Since launch, the company has made several acquisitions aimed at building its technology content reach: In 2003, TechTarget acquired Information Security Magazine. In 2004, the company acquired publications including: Bitpipe.com, TheServerSide.com and TheServerSide.net. In 2007 (the year the company went public), TechTarget  acquired KnowledgeStorm for $58 million. In 2008, TechTarget acquired BrianMadden.com and BriForum. The company acquired LeMagIT and opened local operations in France. In 2011, it made a significant acquisition of Uk-based Computer Weekly, which had been published as a weekly print magazine by Reed Business Information for more than 45 years.

The company launched its current purchase intent data services (IT Deal Alert) for technology vendors in 2014 and has since added to the portfolio with a product called Priority Engine. In 2020, TechTarget acquired technology webinar company BrightTALK. In early 2021 the firm also announced the acquisition of IT analyst firm Enterprise Strategy Group.

References

External links 
 
 eVero Corporation

Technology websites
Technology companies based in Massachusetts
Companies based in Middlesex County, Massachusetts
Newton, Massachusetts
Mass media companies established in 1999
Technology companies established in 1999
1999 establishments in Massachusetts
Companies listed on the Nasdaq